The Three Outlaws is a 1956 American Western film directed by Sam Newfield and starring Neville Brand as Butch Cassidy, Alan Hale Jr. as the Sundance Kid, and Bruce Bennett.

Plot

Cast
 Neville Brand as Butch Cassidy
 Alan Hale Jr. as the Sundance Kid 
 Bruce Bennett as Charlie Trenton
 Jose Gonzales-Gonzales as El Raton 
 Rodolfo Hoyos Jr. as El Gallo 
 Jonathan Hale as Pinkerton
 Stanley Andrews as Railroad President
 Lillian Molieri as Rita Aguilar
 Jeanne Carmen as Polimita
 Robert Tafur as Col. Aguilar
 Robert Christopher as Bill Carver
 Vicente Padula as Mr. Gutzmer 
 Henry A. Escalante as Corporal 
 William Henry as Tall Texan

References

Bibliography
 Pitts, Michael R. Western Movies: A Guide to 5,105 Feature Films. McFarland, 2012.

External links
 

1956 films
1956 Western (genre) films
1950s English-language films
American Western (genre) films
Films directed by Sam Newfield
American black-and-white films
1950s American films